is a Japanese railway vehicle and equipment manufacturer based in Chiyoda, Tokyo. The company is a subsidiary of IHI Corporation and has a factory in Niigata, and representative offices in Osaka, Sapporo, Sendai, and Niigata.

Products

Low-floor LRV
 Kumamoto KCT Kumamoto City Transportation Bureau 0800 series tramcar
 Okayama Electric Railway 9200 "Momo" tramcar 
 Takaoka Manyosen MLRV1000 tramcar
 Toyama Portram TLR0600 tramcar
 Toyama Centram 9000 series tramcar
 Fukui Echizen L-shaped tramcar
 Fukui F1000 series "Fukuram" tramcar

Diesel multiple units
 KiHa 32 series
 KiHa 48 series
 KiHa 85 series
 KiHa 100 series
 KiHa 121 series
 KiHa 122/127 series
 KiHa 126 series
 KiHa 187 series
 KiHa 189 series
 KiHa 200 series
 KiHa 2000 series
 TH2100
 TH9200
 AT500
 HSOR 100
 HSOR 150
 HB-E300 series
 ET122

Electric multiple units 
 HK100 series

Other rolling stock
 JR East E26 series sleeping cars
 12-1201 vintage steam passenger train
 NRNS snow blower
 NS35W airport maintenance vehicle
 Railcars

Clients 
 Toronto Transit Commission 
 RT20 flat car and crane (1980)
 RT21 flat car

References

External links 

  

Manufacturing companies based in Tokyo
Locomotive manufacturers of Japan
Rail infrastructure manufacturers
Rolling stock manufacturers of Japan
Tram manufacturers
Japanese brands
Vehicle manufacturing companies established in 2003
Japanese companies established in 2003
IHI Corporation
Electric vehicle manufacturers of Japan